Caribou (formerly Cariboo) is a census-designated place located in Plumas County, California, United States. As of the 2010 Census, the town had a population of 0. The closest communities are Belden to the southwest, Twain to the southeast, Canyondam to the north, and Greenville to the east.

History
The place started as a placer mining camp in 1850. The name honors an Indian miner named Johnny Caribou.  The Caribou post office operated from 1922 to 1976.

Geography 
Caribou is located at 40°4'48" North, 121°9'27" West (40.079929, -121.157397).

Demographics 

As of the 2010 Census, there are no people living in the town. According to the US Census data, there are only two buildings in the community, both of them listed as "Vacant housing units" and "For seasonal, recreational, or occasional use".

References

External links 
US Census map
History of California, Volume II

Former settlements in Plumas County, California
Census-designated places in Plumas County, California
Ghost towns in California
Census-designated places in California